The 2023 Nigerian presidential election in Sokoto State will be held on 25 February 2023 as part of the nationwide 2023 Nigerian presidential election to elect the president and vice president of Nigeria. Other federal elections, including elections to the House of Representatives and the Senate, will also be held on the same date while state elections will be held two weeks afterward on 11 March.

Background
Sokoto State is a large northwestern state with agricultural and energy potential but facing a debilitated health sector, low education rates, and intense challenges in security as the nationwide kidnapping epidemic, bandit conflict, religious riots, and herder–farmer clashes have all heavily affected the state.

Politically, the 2019 elections were categorized as a swing back towards the PDP. Although Buhari won the state again (by 15%), Sokoto was the state that swung the most towards the PDP in the presidential election; legislatively, the PDP held its one Senate seat after a court ruling and won four House of Representatives seats after the APC won all legislative seats in 2015. Statewise, incumbent Governor Aminu Tambuwal won re-election by about 300 votes while the APC won a narrow majority in the House of Assembly.

Polling

Projections

General election

Results

By senatorial district 
The results of the election by senatorial district.

By federal constituency
The results of the election by federal constituency.

By local government area 
The results of the election by local government area.

See also 
 2023 Sokoto State elections
 2023 Nigerian presidential election

Notes

References 

Sokoto State gubernatorial election
2023 Sokoto State elections
Sokoto